Hainesville is a community in the Canadian province of New Brunswick.

History

Convenience stores in Lower Hainesville:
 
 Madelyn White:  1970s
 Robert Bragdon: early 1980s
 Michael Bragdon: early 1980s
 William Bragdon: early 1980s

Convenience stores in Upper Hainesville:
 
 Perley Morgan:  1970s - 1980s
 Walter Wiggins: 1980s
 Stan Bar: 1980s

Notable people

William Clarke - Owned sawmills in the early 20th century

Perley Morgan - Justice of the Peace, Farmer, General Store Proprietor

See also
List of communities in New Brunswick

References

Communities in York County, New Brunswick